Steven L. Scully (born September 17, 1960) is an American broadcast journalist. He is the host of "The Briefing with Steve Scully" on SiriusXM POTUS 124 and contributor to Hill.com. He is the former C-SPAN Political Editor, as well as host and producer for its morning call-in show Washington Journal, "Washington Today" on C-SPAN Radio and The Weekly, C-SPAN's podcast.                               
Scully served on the board of the White House Correspondents Association for nine years, including as president from 2006 to 2007.

In October 2020, Scully was temporarily placed on administrative leave from C-SPAN for  claiming his Twitter account was hacked.

Early life and education
Scully was born in Erie, Pennsylvania to Hubert L. "Hoot" Scully and Elizabeth Jane North "Betty" Scully. He was the 14th of 16 children, including five sets of twins.

Scully received a 1982 undergraduate degree with honors in communication and political science from American University in Washington, D.C. during which he completed a 1980–81 study abroad program at the University of Copenhagen. He served as an intern for Sen. Joe Biden from September to October 1978 and in Sen. Ted Kennedy's media affairs office in early 1979 earning college credits. Scully then earned a Master of Science degree in journalism from Northwestern University’s Medill School of Journalism graduating magna cum laude in 1984.

Career
Scully began his journalism career in 1981-82 as a weekend newscaster on WAMU, the American University-based radio station. Following his undergraduate degree, he worked as a reporter and anchor for Erie's WSEE-TV in 1982 and 1983. He returned to WSEE after completing his graduate studies in 1984. After a stint as a Washington, D.C.-based correspondent for WHBF-TV in Rock Island, Illinois, he joined WHEC-TV in Rochester, New York, in 1986 as a correspondent covering business, politics and local government. He also taught courses on media and politics as an adjunct faculty member at Nazareth College and St. John Fisher College.

C-SPAN host
Scully joined C-SPAN in 1990 as political editor and White House producer. Since 1990 he has been responsible for coordinating campaign programming for C-SPAN, C-SPAN.org and C-SPAN Radio. As senior producer for the network's White House coverage, Scully manages a team of field producers responsible for coverage of the White House, politics and special projects. He serves as a regular Sunday host of Washington Journal, a live three-hour news and public affairs program. He is a host and moderator for a number of other C-SPAN programs, including Newsmakers, Road to the White House and In Depth on Book TV. In addition to his television work, he regularly appears on C-SPAN Radio's Washington Today, a live two-hour afternoon drive time program broadcast nationwide on Sirius XM Radio.

Scully prepared for and served as backup moderator for all four the presidential and vice presidential debates during fall 2016. He was supposed to moderate the aforementioned second 2020 presidential debate, but the debate was cancelled when Donald Trump, the Republican nominee, refused to agree to a virtual debate after his COVID-19 diagnosis.

On October 15, 2020, the date that the second 2020 Presidential Debate in Miami was supposed to be held, C-SPAN suspended Scully temporarily after he admitted to lying about his Twitter feed being hacked when confronted about an exchange he had with Anthony Scaramucci. According to Politico, it was not the first time Scully "used the [hacking] excuse to disavow posts in his name, having done so at least twice in the past". The Daily Beast reported that, in 2012 and 2013, Scully "apologized for tweets about weight loss, among other things, saying, 'Darn those hackers.'" In reference to the Scaramucci tweet, Scully apologised to his colleagues stating  "I ask for their forgiveness."

Scully returned as a producer for the call-in show Washington Journal, and The Weekly, from January 5, 2021. He returned to host Washington Journal on April 5, 2021.

In July 2021, Scully departed from C-SPAN to take a position as vice president of communications at the Bipartisan Policy Center.

University lecturer
In January 2003, Scully assumed the Amos P. Hostetter Chair at the University of Denver and Cable Center, teaching a distance learning course on media, politics and public policy issues via a cable television connection between Washington, D.C., University of Denver, Pace University, and George Mason University. The class aired on C-SPAN and C-SPAN3, and was streamed via the C-SPAN website. He taught the course at the University of Denver until 2011.  He has also taught at George Mason University in conjunction with Purdue University and The Washington Center.  He has been a faculty member at the University of California DC Program and George Washington University.

White House Correspondents' Association
Scully served nine years on the Executive Board of the White House Correspondents' Association, and was elected by his peers to serve as president from 2006 to 2007. Until her death, Scully's mother accompanied him to most WHCA dinners throughout the administrations of Presidents Bill Clinton, George W. Bush, and Barack Obama.

SiriusXM
On June 6, 2022, Scully began hosting a new show, The Briefing with Steve Scully, on SiriusXM satellite radio. The show will air weekdays on SiriusXM's POTUS Channel from 12:00 PM to 2:00 PM eastern time.

Recognition
According to Politico, Scully is known in the media for his "evenhandedness".  He was the 2009 recipient of the Fitzwater Center for Communications Award, for exemplary journalism and public service, and in the same year was recognized by The Washingtonian as one of the capital's "50 Top Journalists". John Oliver has repeatedly referred to Scully as "The Most Patient Man on Television". Scully was inducted into the Pennsylvania Association of Broadcasters Hall of Fame in 2019.

Personal life
Scully and his wife, Kathryn R. "Katie" Scully, reside in Fairfax Station, Virginia. They have four children, one of which they adopted in 2008. Two others died in childhood, Carolyn in 1994 of sudden infant death syndrome (SIDS) and Jack in 1996. Scully serves on the board of both the CJ Foundation for SIDS which raises money for sudden infant death syndrome research, St. Jude's Children Hospital and First Candle which aims to increases public awareness of SIDS.

References

External links

Steve Scully's oral history for The Cable Center's Hauser Oral History Collection, May 26, 2011

1960 births
Living people
People from Erie, Pennsylvania
Businesspeople from Rochester, New York
People from Fairfax Station, Virginia
American broadcasters
American University School of Communication alumni
Medill School of Journalism alumni
University of Denver faculty
C-SPAN people
Journalists from New York (state)
Journalists from Pennsylvania
American University School of Public Affairs alumni